The 1935 Santa Barbara State Roadrunners football team represented Santa Barbara State during the 1935 college football season.

Santa Barbara State competed in the Southern California Intercollegiate Athletic Conference (SCIAC). The Roadrunners were led by second-year head coach Theodore "Spud" Harder and played home games at Peabody Stadium in Santa Barbara, California. They finished the season with a record of five wins, two losses and two ties (5–2–2, 2–2–1 SCIAC). Overall, the team outscored its opponents 97–32 for the season. The Roadrunners had four shutouts, and held the other team to a touchdown or less in all 9 games.

Schedule

Notes

References

Santa Barbara State
UC Santa Barbara Gauchos football seasons
Santa Barbara State Roadrunners football